The Talented Timothy Taylor is a studio album by American rapper Wise Intelligent. It was released on Shaman Work in 2007.

Reception
Stewart Mason of AllMusic gave the album 3.5 stars out of 5, saying, "Wise Intelligent uses modern-day production styles and his own, undiminished, old-school flow to create a rapprochement between hip-hop's present and past, and the combination works perfectly." Jordan Selbo of City Pages called it "one of the hottest releases this summer."

It ranked at number 45 on PopMatters "101 Hip-Hop Albums of 2007" list.

Track listing

References

External links
 

2007 albums
Hip hop albums by American artists